Cartland may refer to:

People 
Barbara Cartland (1901–2000), English author, known for her numerous romance novels
George Cartland (1912–2008), the only deputy-governor of Uganda; later Vice-Chancellor of the University of Tasmania
Michael David Cartland (born 1945), the Secretary for Financial Services of Hong Kong during British rule in the 1990s
Moses Austin Cartland (1805–1863), Quaker abolitionist
Ronald Cartland (1907–1940), British Conservative Member of Parliament from 1935 until he was killed in action in 1940

Places 
 Cartland, South Lanarkshire, Scotland

See also
 Cartland Craigs, a woodland on the outskirts of Lanark, South Lanarkshire, Scotland